Eden is a local government district in Cumbria, England, based at Penrith Town Hall in Penrith. It is named after the River Eden, which flows north through the district toward Carlisle. Its population of 49,777 at the 2001 census, increased to 52,564 at the 2011 Census. A 2019 estimate was 53,253. In July 2021 it was announced that in April 2023, Cumbria will divide into two unitary authorities. Eden District Council will cease and its functions pass to a new authority, Westmorland and Furness, covering the current districts of Barrow-in-Furness, Eden and South Lakeland.

Extent
The Eden District area of 2,156 sq. km (832 square miles) makes it, since 2009, the eighth largest in England and the largest non-unitary district. It also has the lowest population density of any district in England and Wales, with a mean of 25 persons per square kilometre.

In 2011, the population was 5 per cent above its 2001 level.

The district council was created on 1 April 1974 under the Local Government Act 1972, from Penrith Urban District, Alston with Garrigill Rural District and Penrith Rural District, all in Cumberland, and Appleby Municipal Borough, part of Lakes urban district and North Westmorland Rural District, all in Westmorland. The district includes parts of the Lake District and Yorkshire Dales national parks.

Communications
The West Coast Main Railway Line runs through the district, but with only one station at Penrith. Services on the line are provided by Avanti West Coast and TransPennine Express. The Northern Settle-Carlisle Railway also runs through, with stations at Armathwaite, Lazonby, Langwathby, Appleby and Kirkby Stephen.

Roads through the district include the M6 motorway, the A6 and the A66.

Green space
It was shown in a national detailed Land Use Survey by the Office for National Statistics in 2005 that Eden District has the second lowest proportion of land taken up by roads of any district in England: 0.8 per cent, fractionally greater than Craven in North Yorkshire, which also adjoins the Pennines. This compares with a maximum of over 20 per cent in four London boroughs and the City of London.

In that detailed survey (to the nearest square metre) it was shown that Eden District had the greatest proportion of green space (which excludes domestic gardens) of any district, 97.9 per cent, as shown by the following extract:

Wards
Below is a list of the wards that form Eden (with numbers of councillors):

Map

Amenities
Eden includes King George's Fields, named after King George V, at Appleby and Patterdale.

The council owns the Penrith Leisure Centre, which is run by a private company under contract. The council also owns a number of playing fields and recreation grounds elsewhere in the district, notably the sports grounds at Frenchfield near Carleton on the outskirts of Penrith. It
also owns and runs Penrith and Eden Museum and the Penrith Tourist Information Centre.

See also
Grade II* listed buildings in Eden
List of churches in Eden District

References

 
Non-metropolitan districts of Cumbria